Cool, formerly known as Cave Valley, is a small town in El Dorado County, California, about  from Sacramento, the state capital.  Cool is at an elevation of 1,532 feet (467 m).

The population is 4,100 according to the 2010 census and is contained within the area code 530 with a ZIP code of 95614.

Geography
It is built on State Route 49 between Auburn and Placerville on a hill at an elevation more than 1,500 feet (450 m) in an area full of trees, trails, camping, and other recreational activities.

The temperature ranges from 75° to 105° Fahrenheit (23 °C to 41 °C) in the summer and 25° to 50° Fahrenheit (-4 °C to 10 °C) in the winter.

Climate
According to the Köppen Climate Classification system, Cool has a warm-summer Mediterranean climate, abbreviated "Csa" on climate maps.

History
The first post office was established in 1885.  Penobscot Public House, established in 1850, was a way station and stage coach stop during the days of the Gold Rush.  The Penobscot Ranch still exists today.

Ultramarathon
The Way Too Cool 50 Kilometer run starts and ends in the town in early March. It follows sections of the Western States Trail with more than 4000 ft (1200+ m) elevation change along its 31-mile length.

Politics

Education
The Black Oak Mine Unified School District serves Cool. Cool currently has just one school - Northside STEAM School - catering for elementary (TK-6). Residents are zoned to Golden Sierra Junior Senior High School for 7-12 grades.

Until 2007 there was also another K-8 school in Cool, the Cool Christian School.

References

Pacific Historian 10 (Summer 1966 pages 19–42):  Goodness, Gold, and Gold, The California Mining Career of Peter Y. Cool 1851-52.

External links

 Way Too Cool 50k webpage
 http://www.historichwy49.com

Unincorporated communities in California
Unincorporated communities in El Dorado County, California
Unincorporated communities in the Sacramento metropolitan area